Goodyears Bar, known as Slaughter's Bar before 1851, is a census-designated place (CDP) in Sierra County, California, United States. Goodyears Bar has a post office with ZIP code 95944. The post office opened in 1851.

History
Goodyears Bar is a historic gold mining camp. Gold was discovered here by the brothers Miles and Andrew Goodyear, along with a Dr. Vaughan and a Mr. Morrison in 1849. It was given the name Goodyears Bar in honor of its founders. The Goodyear boys built a cabin there. Miners prospected gold on the Goodyears Creek. A post office was established on October 7, 1851 with Mr. Woodruff as the first Postmaster. The first school was begun in 1856 with Mrs. Massey as the first teacher.

Folk singer Kate Wolf is buried in Goodyears Bar.

Geography
According to the United States Census Bureau, the CDP covers an area of 2.1 square miles (5.4 km2), 99.19% of it land and 0.81% of it water.

Climate
This region experiences warm (but not hot) and dry summers, with no average monthly temperatures above 71.6 °F.  According to the Köppen Climate Classification system, Goodyears Bar has a warm-summer Mediterranean climate, abbreviated "Csb" on climate maps.

Demographics

The 2010 United States Census reported that Goodyears Bar had a population of 68. The racial makeup of Goodyears Bar was 64 (94.1%) White, 0 (0.0%) African American, 4 (5.9%) Native American, 0 (0.0%) Asian, 0 (0.0%) Pacific Islander, 0 (0.0%) from other races, and 0 (0.0%) from two or more races. Hispanic or Latino of any race were 1 persons (1.5%).

The Census reported that 68 people (100% of the population) lived in households, 0 (0%) lived in non-institutionalized group quarters, and 0 (0%) were institutionalized.

There were 38 households, out of which 3 (7.9%) had children under the age of 18 living in them, 19 (50.0%) were opposite-sex married couples living together, 0 (0%) had a female householder with no husband present, 4 (10.5%) had a male householder with no wife present.  There were 1 (2.6%) unmarried opposite-sex partnerships, and 1 (2.6%) same-sex married couples or partnerships. 13 households (34.2%) were made up of individuals, and 3 (7.9%) had someone living alone who was 65 years of age or older. The average household size was 1.79.  There were 23 families (60.5% of all households); the average family size was 2.22.

The population was spread out, with 3 people (4.4%) under the age of 18, 5 people (7.4%) aged 18 to 24, 7 people (10.3%) aged 25 to 44, 37 people (54.4%) aged 45 to 64, and 16 people (23.5%) who were 65 years of age or older.  The median age was 56.0 years. For every 100 females, there were 161.5 males.  For every 100 females age 18 and over, there were 160.0 males.

There were 51 housing units at an average density of 24.7 per square mile (9.5/km2), of which 22 (57.9%) were owner-occupied, and 16 (42.1%) were occupied by renters. The homeowner vacancy rate was 0%; the rental vacancy rate was 11.1%.  43 people (63.2% of the population) lived in owner-occupied housing units and 25 people (36.8%) lived in rental housing units.

Politics

References

External links
 Discover Sierra County
History of Goodyears Bar at Western Mining History

Census-designated places in Sierra County, California
Populated places in the Sierra Nevada (United States)
Downieville, California